Macroketones are macrocyclic compounds that contain a ketone functional group. Macroketones form the central rings systems of some synthetic polyketide antibiotics.

References

Ketones
Macrocycles